is a statue located in Ushiku, Ibaraki Prefecture, Japan. The statue held the record for the tallest statue from 1993 to 2008. , it is one of the top five tallest statues in the world.

An elevator takes visitors up  to an observation floor. The statue depicts Amitabha Buddha and is made of bronze. It is also known as Ushiku ARCADIA (Amida's Radiance and Compassion Actually Developing and Illuminating Area). It was built to commemorate the birth of Shinran, founder of the Jōdo Shinshū 浄土真宗 or "True Pure Land School" of Buddhism.

Construction

First, a cast iron steel column was elected at the center supporting the weight of the entire Daibutsu. Then, arranging a steel frame structure around it which was pre-assembled on the ground block by block in advance.

The 100 meter high torso, or body, of the statue was divided into 20 tiers, with each tier consisting of 17 blocks on average. In addition, each component block had welded on 9  bronze sheets, 1.5 meters by 1.5 meters and around 6 millimeters thick, on a steel frame. Those steel frames connected to the main frame as branches of a tree do, forming a complicated outline. The bronze sheets are much lighter compared to that of the Great Buddha at Tōdai-ji temple in Nara, since the one at Ushiku applies steel frame to support the structure. The elaborate design of each hand and arm was also assembled on the ground, then attached on the body with a huge crane lifting each parts.

Details
Weight: 
Length of Left Hand: 
Length of Face: 
Length of Eye: 
Length of Mouth: 
Length of Nose: 
Length of Ear: 
Length of the First Finger: 

Inside the statue itself is a four-story building, which serves as a museum.

 Level 1, Infinite Light and Infinite Life  The first floor lobby is dark. In the center of the room a single shaft of light shines from above onto a cauldron of smoking incense. Beyond it is the elevator to the other floors.
 Level 2 (10.0 m), World of Gratitude and Thankfulness  Mostly dedicated to scriptural studies
 Level 3 (20~30.0 m), World of the Lotus Sanctuary  3000 samples of gold Buddha statues
 Level 4 (80~85.0 m), Room of Mt. Grdhrakuta  Also on the fourth floor are windows looking out from the buddha's chest onto the adjacent flower garden and small animal park.

See also
Daibutsu
Kōtoku-in, temple in Kamakura, home to second largest seated bronze Buddha statue in Japan.
Tōdai-ji, temple in Nara, home to largest seated bronze Buddha statue in Japan.
Leshan Giant Buddha in China, the tallest stone Buddha sculpture in the world.
Tian Tan Buddha, located in Hong Kong, world's tallest seated Buddha statue.
List of tallest statues, many of which are Buddhist statues

References

External links
 
Tallest statues by Reuters

1993 establishments in Japan
1993 sculptures
Bronze Buddha statues
Bronze sculptures in Japan
 Japan
Cultural infrastructure completed in 1993
Buildings and structures in Ibaraki Prefecture
Buddhist temples in Ibaraki Prefecture
Colossal Buddha statues in Japan
Outdoor sculptures in Japan
Statues in Japan
Tourist attractions in Ibaraki Prefecture
Pure Land temples
Jōdo Shin temples